The men's regu sepak takraw competition at the 2006 Asian Games in Doha was held from 8 December to 10 December at the Al-Sadd Indoor Hall.

Squads

Results 
All times are Arabia Standard Time (UTC+03:00)

Preliminary

Group A

|-
|8 December||09:00
|align=right|
|align=center|2–0
|align=left|
|21–7||21–16||
|-
|8 December||10:00
|align=right|
|align=center|2–0
|align=left|
|21–15||21–18||
|-
|8 December||15:00
|align=right|
|align=center|2–0
|align=left|
|21–17||21–16||
|-
|8 December||16:00
|align=right|
|align=center|0–2
|align=left|
|20–22||23–25||
|-
|8 December||19:00
|align=right|
|align=center|0–2
|align=left|
|14–21||21–23||
|-
|9 December||09:00
|align=right|
|align=center|0–2
|align=left|
|15–21||17–21||
|-
|9 December||10:00
|align=right|
|align=center|2–0
|align=left|
|21–16||21–10||
|-
|9 December||14:00
|align=right|
|align=center|2–0
|align=left|
|21–16||21–8||
|-
|9 December||15:00
|align=right|
|align=center|2–0
|align=left|
|21–15||21–18||
|-
|9 December||18:00
|align=right|
|align=center|2–0
|align=left|
|21–8||21–14||

Group B

|-
|8 December||09:00
|align=right|
|align=center|2–0
|align=left|
|21–7||21–7||
|-
|8 December||10:00
|align=right|
|align=center|2–1
|align=left|
|19–21||21–18||15–9
|-
|8 December||15:00
|align=right|
|align=center|0–2
|align=left|
|14–21||18–21||
|-
|8 December||16:00
|align=right|
|align=center|2–0
|align=left|
|21–9||21–9||
|-
|8 December||20:00
|align=right|
|align=center|1–2
|align=left|
|21–14||3–21||7–15
|-
|9 December||09:00
|align=right|
|align=center|2–0
|align=left|
|21–14||21–13||
|-
|9 December||10:00
|align=right|
|align=center|2–0
|align=left|
|21–7||21–7||
|-
|9 December||14:00
|align=right|
|align=center|2–1
|align=left|
|21–19||18–21||15–9
|-
|9 December||15:00
|align=right|
|align=center|2–0
|align=left|
|21–7||21–14||
|-
|9 December||18:00
|align=right|
|align=center|2–0
|align=left|
|21–17||21–17||

Knockout round

Semifinals

|-
|10 December||11:00
|align=right|
|align=center|2–0
|align=left|
|21–14||21–17||
|-
|10 December||12:00
|align=right|
|align=center|2–0
|align=left|
|21–18||21–19||

Final

|-
|10 December||17:00
|align=right|
|align=center|2–0
|align=left|
|21–19||22–20||

References 

Official Website
Results

Sepak takraw at the 2006 Asian Games